Crassispira sanctistephani is an extinct species of sea snail, a marine gastropod mollusk in the family Pseudomelatomidae, the turrids and allies.

Description

Distribution
Fossils have been found in Oligocene strata in Aquitaine, France

References

 Lozouet P. (2017). Les Conoidea de l'Oligocène supérieur (Chattien) du bassin de l'Adour (Sud-Ouest de la France). Cossmanniana. 19: 3-180

External links
 MNHN: Crassispira sanctistephani

sanctistephani
Gastropods described in 2017